The Euphradian Society, also known as  (Phi Alpha Epsilon), a local society is a literary society founded in 1806 at the University of South Carolina, then known as South Carolina College. The society was formed as a result of the splitting in two of the Philomathic Society, which had been created within weeks of the opening of the college in 1805 and included virtually all enrolled students. At what was called the Synapian Convention held in February, 1806, the members of Philomathic decided to split into separate societies, one of which became known as Euphradian, while the other became known as Clariosophic.

References

College literary societies in the United States
History of South Carolina
University of South Carolina
Student organizations established in 1806
1806 establishments in South Carolina